Clean  may refer to:

 Cleaning, the process of removing unwanted substances, such as dirt, infectious agents, and other impurities, from an object or environment
 Cleanliness, the state of being clean and free from dirt

Arts and media

Music

Albums
Clean (Cloroform album), 2007
 Clean (Deitiphobia album), 1994
 Clean (Severed Heads album), 1981
 Clean (Shane & Shane album), 2004
 Clean (Soccer Mommy album), 2018
 Clean (The Japanese House EP), second EP by English indie pop act The Japanese House
 Clean (Whores EP), second EP by American rock band Whores
 Clean, an Edwin Starr album

Songs
 "Clean", a song by Depeche Mode from their 1990 album Violator
"Clean", a song by Taylor Swift from her album 1989, also covered by Ryan Adams from his album 1989
"Clean", a song by KSI and Randolph from the 2019 album New Age

Other uses in music
 Clean, an amplifier sound in guitar terminology
 Clean vocals, a term used for singing to distinguish it from unclean vocals, such as screaming or growling
 The Clean, an influential first-wave indie rock band

Other uses in arts, entertainment, and media
 Clean (2004 film), a 2004 French drama film directed by Olivier Assayas
 Clean (2021 film), a 2021 American crime drama film directed by Paul Solet
 Clean comedy (or clean performance), entertainment which avoids profanity and other objectionable material; the opposite of blue comedy

Sports
 Clean and jerk, a weightlifting movement
 Clean climbing, the choice to employ non-destructive hardware and techniques in rock climbing

Other uses
 Clean (programming language), a purely functional programming language
 Clean language, a questioning technique used in psychotherapy and coaching

See also 
 CLEAN (disambiguation)
 Cleaning (disambiguation)